al-Fayruziyah is a small village in northern Aleppo Governorate, northwestern Syria.

The village administratively belongs to Nahiya Azaz in Azaz District. Nearby localities include Nayarah  to the west, and Yahmul  to the south. In the 2004 census, al-Fayruziyah had a population of 88.

References

Populated places in Syria